Françoiz Breut (born 10 December 1969, in Cherbourg) is the stage name of Françoise Breut, a French illustrator and chanteuse of moody and melancholic pop. Breut got involved with music when her then-fiancé, French pop star Dominique A, asked her to contribute vocals on three songs of his 1993 album, Si Je Connais Harry. He then wrote and arranged most of the songs for her eponymous debut album. She has also collaborated with Yann Tiersen, Louise Attaque, and Calexico. She lives in Brussels, Belgium.

Discography
1997 Françoiz Breut (Lithium, Bella Union)
2000 Vingt à Trente Mille Jours
2005 Une Saison Volée
2008 À L'Aveuglette
2010 Inédits + Live (Tour-CDR)
2012 La chirurgie des sentiments
2015 Françoiz Breut & Friends
2016 Zoo
2021 Flux flou de la foule

Bibliography
1999 Illustrations for "La mer a disparu" with Michel Piquemal (Nathan, coll. Demi-lune)  
2002 Illustrations for "Je suis un garçon" with Arnaud Cathrine (L'école de loisirs coll. Neuf) 
2006 Illustrations for "Le Bobobook" with Stéphane Malandrin (La Joie de Lire)

References
[ Allmusic entry]
Radio France International biography

External links
Official site
 
 Unofficial fan site
 Page at Labels records
 Page at tôt Ou tard records
 french-music.org profile
 Stereokill Snapshot article

1969 births
Living people
French women singers
Bella Union artists